Gustav Kroon (1 June 1872 Sinalepa Parish, Kreis Wiek – 4 June 1942 Vyatka prison camp, Kirov Oblast, Russian SFSR) was an Estonian politician. He was a member of II Riigikogu. He was a member of the Riigikogu since 25 July 1923. He replaced Jüri Uluots.

References

1872 births
1942 deaths
People from Haapsalu
People from Kreis Wiek
Farmers' Assemblies politicians
Members of the Riigikogu, 1923–1926
Estonian people who died in Soviet detention